Quilacahuín was a Huilliche aillarehue, that is a confederation of familial clans, of the Chawra kawin Butalmapu located south of the Bueno River, between the Rahue River and the sea, in southern Chile.

Sources 
  Juan Ignatius Molina, The Geographical, Natural, and Civil History of Chili, Longman, Hurst, Rees, and Orme, London, 1809
 Ricardo E. Latcham,  La organización social y las creencias religiosas de los antiguos araucanos, Santiago de Chile, Impr. Cervantes, 1924.

Huilliche people
Social history of Chile